Bipemba is a commune of the city of Mbuji-Mayi in the Democratic Republic of the Congo.

Mbuji-Mayi
Communes of the Democratic Republic of the Congo